Philippe Briand (born 26 October 1960 in Tours) was a member of the National Assembly of France. He represented the Indre-et-Loire department, as a member of The Republicans.

References

1960 births
Living people
Politicians from Tours, France
Rally for the Republic politicians
The Republicans (France) politicians
The Strong Right
Gaullism, a way forward for France
Secretaries of State of France
Mayors of places in Centre-Val de Loire
Deputies of the 12th National Assembly of the French Fifth Republic
Deputies of the 13th National Assembly of the French Fifth Republic
Deputies of the 14th National Assembly of the French Fifth Republic